Vyachaslaw Hryharaw (born 8 March 1982) is a Belarusian professional football coach and former player. From 2015 till 2017 he managed FC Slutsk.

Honours
BATE Borisov
Belarusian Premier League champion: 2002

External links

1982 births
Living people
People from Baranavichy
Sportspeople from Brest Region
Belarusian footballers
Association football midfielders
Belarusian expatriate footballers
Expatriate footballers in the Czech Republic
FC RUOR Minsk players
FC BATE Borisov players
FC Torpedo Minsk players
FC Neman Grodno players
FC Granit Mikashevichi players
FC Slutsk players
Belarusian football managers
FC Slutsk managers
FC Rukh Brest managers